María Irma Ortega Fajardo  is a Mexican politician affiliated with the Ecologist Green Party of Mexico. As of 2014 she served as Senator of the LX Legislature of the Mexican Congress.

References

Date of birth unknown
Living people
Politicians from Jalisco
Women members of the Senate of the Republic (Mexico)
Members of the Senate of the Republic (Mexico)
Ecologist Green Party of Mexico politicians
21st-century Mexican politicians
21st-century Mexican women politicians
Year of birth missing (living people)